The Bishop of Oxford is the diocesan bishop of the Church of England Diocese of Oxford in the Province of Canterbury; his seat is at Christ Church Cathedral, Oxford. The current bishop is Steven Croft, following the confirmation of his election to the See on 6 July 2016.

The Bishop of Oxford has authority throughout the diocese, but also has primary responsibility for the city and suburbs of Oxford, which form the Archdeaconry of Oxford.

From 1636 the Bishop was housed in the purpose-built Cuddesdon Palace.

History
The origins of Christianity in this part of England go back at least to the 7th century, when Saint Birinus brought his mission to the West Saxons in 634. The West Saxon King Cynegils was baptised in the River Thames near the present site of Dorchester Abbey, where the original See was established.

The see was transferred in 1092 to Winchester, before being absorbed into the Diocese of Lincoln, the vast extent of which covered much of central and eastern England from the River Thames to the Humber.

King Henry VIII, acting now as head of the Church in England, established by Act of Parliament in 1542 six new dioceses, mostly out of the spoils of the suppressed monasteries. These six were Bristol, Chester, Gloucester, Oxford, Peterborough and Westminster. This intervention by Henry VIII saw a new see located at Osney in Oxfordshire in 1542 before finally being moved to its present location in the City of Oxford in 1546.

While the city gained prosperity from the accession of thousands of students, it was never, apart from the university, again prominent in history until the seventeenth century, when it became the headquarters of the Royalist party, and again the meeting-place of Parliament. The city of Oxford showed its Hanoverian sympathies long before the university, and feeling between them ran high in consequence. The area and population of the city remained almost stationary until about 1830, but since then it has grown rapidly.

Modern bishopric
The modern diocese covers the counties of Oxfordshire, Berkshire, and Buckinghamshire, with parishes also in Bedfordshire, Gloucestershire, Hampshire, Hertfordshire, and Warwickshire.  The see is in the City of Oxford where the seat is located at the Cathedral Church of Christ which was elevated to cathedral status in 1546, and which (uniquely among English dioceses) is also the chapel of Christ Church, Oxford.
The Oxford diocese at the present day contains the greatest number of parishes of any diocese on England (621) and also the most church buildings (815), of which 475 are grade 1 or 2* listed buildings.

Croft is the first to reside at the new Bishop's Lodge, Kidlington; "for decades" previously, bishops had resided at Linton Road in North Oxford. Each bishop signs + Christian name Oxon:; e.g. + Steven Oxon:.

List of bishops
List of the Bishops of Oxford, and its precursor offices.

(Dates in italics indicate de facto continuation of office)

Assistant bishops
Among those who have served the diocese as stipendiary (i.e. not retired) Assistant Bishops have been:
19211936 (ret.): Edward Shaw, Archdeacon of Oxford and canon residentiary of Christ Church; former Bishop suffragan of Buckingham
19361939: Gerald Allen, Archdeacon of Oxford and Canon of Christ Church, former Bishop of Sherborne (became first Bishop suffragan of Dorchester)
19471952 (ret.): Roscow Shedden, Vicar of Wantage and former Bishop of Nassau
late 19511963 (d.): Vibert Jackson, Vicar of South Ascot (since 1940) and former Bishop of the Windward Islands
: Geoffrey Allen, Principal of Ripon Hall and former Bishop in Egypt (became Bishop of Derby)
1986–1988: Patrick Harris, Secretary of the Partnership for World Mission and former Bishop of Northern Argentina (later Bishop of Southwell)

Those who have served in (or into) retirement have included:
1952 (ret.)1956 (d.): Roscow Shedden, former Bishop of Nassau
1952 (ret.)1956 (d.): Gerald Allen, retired Bishop suffragan of Dorchester
1954 (ret.)1961 (d.): Arthur Parham, retired Bishop suffragan of Reading

See also

Cuddesdon Palace

Notes

References
Oxford Diocesan Year Book
Haydn's Book of Dignities (1894) Joseph Haydn/Horace Ockerby, reprinted (1969)
Whitaker's Almanack 1883 to 2004, Joseph Whitaker and Sons Ltd/A&C Black, London
The above text is partly drawn from the Catholic Encyclopaedia of 1908

History of Oxford
Oxford
Diocese of Oxford
Bishops of Oxford